The Böd of Gremista, situated at the north end of Lerwick, Shetland, Scotland, is a typical 18th century Shetland fishing booth (or böd). It is protected as a category B listed building.

History
The Böd was built in 1780 by Arthur Nicholson, local landowner and manager of the Gremista fishing station. The building  provided family accommodation and a store for the fishing and fish curing activities that took place on the adjacent beach.

It was the birthplace of Arthur Anderson, co-founder of Peninsular and Oriental Steam Navigation Company, (now P&O).

The building fell into disrepair but was restored with grants provided by P&O and the UK Government in 1970, the first phase being completed in 1976. It opened as a museum in 1987, was acquired by the Shetland Museums Service in 1991 and was run as a community museum by the Shetland Amenity Trust. The exhibition included period furnishings and other artefacts together with displays on fishing and the life of Anderson. In 2017 the building was a Shetland textile museum run by a board of trustees and exhibited Shetland textiles from 1800s to the present day including wool, jumpers, Fair Isle, lace, rugs and weaving.

References

External links
 Böd of Gremista and Shetland Textile Museum - official site

Category B listed buildings in Shetland
Maritime museums in Scotland
Biographical museums in Scotland
Historic house museums in Shetland
Listed museum buildings in Scotland
1780 establishments in Scotland
Houses completed in 1780
Fishing in Scotland
Museums established in 1987
1987 establishments in Scotland
Lerwick